Carlito means "little Carlos". It may refer to:

Biology 
Carlito (genus), a genus of tarsiers
The Philippine tarsier (Carlito syrichta), the only extant species in the above genus

People 
 Carlito (name)
 Carlito (wrestler), a ring name used by professional wrestler, Carlos Edwin Colón Jr.

Other 
 Carlito (typeface), a typeface released by Google with metrics compatible with Microsoft's Calibri typeface

See also 

 Carlitos
Carloto
Thiago Carleto